Jaal may refer to:

 Jaal (1952 film)
 Jaal (1967 film)
 Jaal (1973 film)
 Jaal (1986 film)
 Jaal (TV series), a 2019 Pakistani Urdu-language drama television series
 Jaal: The Trap, a 2003 film
 Jaal, a 2012 fantasy novel by Indian author Sangeeta Bahadur
 Jaal Ama Darav, a character in the 2017 video game Mass Effect: Andromeda